Cholent and other Sabbath stews are traditional Jewish stews. It is usually simmered overnight for 10–12 hours or more, and eaten for lunch on Shabbat (the Sabbath). Shabbat stews were developed over the centuries to conform with Jewish laws that prohibit cooking on the Sabbath. The pot is brought to a boil on Friday before the Sabbath begins, and sometimes kept on a blech or hotplate, or left in a slow oven or electric slow cooker, until the following day. Cholent originated as a barley porridge in ancient Judea called "harisa" or "horisa", possibly as far back as the Second Temple period, and over the centuries various Jewish diaspora communities created their own variations of the dish based on local food resources and neighborhood influence.

There are many variations of the dish, which is standard in both the Ashkenazi and Sephardi kitchens and among other communities. The basic ingredients of cholent are meat, potatoes, beans and barley though all shabbat stews contain some type of grain and meat or featured vegetable. Slow overnight cooking allows the flavors of the various ingredients to permeate and produces the characteristic taste of each local stew.

Etymology
"Harisa", also transliterated as "horisa", derived from the Semitic origins of "haras" meaning "to break" to describe the action of breaking and crushing barley before mixing it with water to create a porridge.

Hamin (pronounced ḥamin), the Iberian precursor to cholent, derives from the Hebrew word  ('hot') likely as harisa was adapted to become a shabbat stew. Sometimes this was called "trasnochado" ("overnighted" in Spanish) but still contained the same ingredients. After the Reconquista in Spain, Iberian Jews hid their hamin pots under the fire embers to avoid persecution and exposure of Jewish practices, renaming the dish dafina ( diminutive of "buried") from the Latin letters "d-f-n" (which echoes the Mishnaic phrase "bury the hot food"). Other variations of shabbat stews include Arabic words dependent on each stew's origin. Moroccans eat sakhina/S'hina/skhena (diminutive of "hot") while Ethiopians "sanbat wat", a play on "shabbat wat", to mimic a local treif dish "doro wat", meaning "chicken stew" in Amharic.

Another possible etymology is from Old French  (hot lentils). This last proposed etymology is unlikely, as the "d" in chaudes is pronounced and not silent, and therefore too far from the pronunciation of tsholnt or tsholent (Old French is notable for its final consonants being pronounced and not silent as in the case of Modern French).

Origins of hot stews on Shabbat

In traditional  Ashkenazi, Sephardi, and Mizrahi families, stew is the hot main course of the midday Shabbat meal served on Saturdays typically after the morning synagogue services for practicing Jews. Secular Jewish families also serve stews like cholent or eat them in Israeli restaurants. For practicing Jews, lighting a fire and cooking food are among the activities prohibited on Shabbat by the written Torah. Therefore, cooked Shabbat food must be prepared before the onset of the Jewish Shabbat at sunset Friday night.

Very little documentation of Jewish diet before the 6th century exists except in small circles and the scriptures from the Torah. Around the reign of King Herod in the first century BCE, a divergence in scholarship led to three practices of halacha: the Pharisees, Sadducees, and the Essenes. Modern Jews claim descent from the Pharisees as the strictest observation of halacha. After the destruction of the 2nd Temple, Rabbinical authorities began to work on the Mishnah to preserve Oral Law in an attempt to remain unified on halachic rulings. The Karaites often disagreed with Rabbinic rulings like the kosher status of chickens and eggs or whether fire is allowed to burn during shabbat leading to avoidance of candle light the entire day. This stems from the verse "You shall not [burn] (Heb: bi'er the pi'el form of ba'ar) a fire in any of your dwellings on the day of Shabbat." Rabbinic Judaism however, the qal verb form ba'ar is understood to mean "burn", whereas the pi'el form (present here) is understood to be not intensive but causative. (The rule being that the pi'el of a stative verb will be causative, instead of the usual hif'il.) Hence bi'er means "kindle", which is why Rabbinic Judaism prohibits only starting a fire on Shabbat. Historian Aaron Gross proposes this caused a rise in popularity of shabbat stews as a hot meal.

Diasporic history and new ingredients 
As the Jewish diaspora grew with Jewish migrations into Europe, North Africa, and elsewhere in the Middle East and Central Asia, Jewish diaspora communities developed their own variations of the dish based on the local climate, available ingredients and local influence.  John Cooper in argues that shabbat stews like cholent would have spread from Jerusalem east towards Babylon and simultaneously across the Mediterranean by North Africa into Iberia and eventually Italy and France while Marks cites Persian, Yemen and Italian communities to predate Sephardim in Iberia.

Original diets 
Shabbat stews of the Bukharian Jews and Mizrahi Jews in the Asian Central Steppe who trace their diaspora to Babylonian exile have the most distinct versions of shabbat stews that relate closest to their non-Jewish neighbors and often resembled the closed proposed ingredients and methods to the original harisa.

The most accessible foods to Jews living in Israel before the destruction of the Second Temple likely ate the Mediterranean Triad: grain, oil and wine, which were available at low cost and vast amounts. While both wheat and barley were grown in Israel, barley was more likely to supplement inland Palestine. Cooper argues wheat would have been twice as expensive as barley which could grow in rougher soils closer to Jerusalem. Barley could also be harvested earlier ensuring multiple crops in the same season.

Meats were considered "luxury" goods that few could afford except on special occasions like shabbat and other holidays. Lambs and goats would have been popular as they grazed in arid climates and provided supplementary products like wool and milk while cattle were more expensive to maintain and priced as sacrificial.

Iberia under the Moors: Meat/eggs 
Chicken was likely domesticated in Southeast Asia and popularized in Ur around 2100 BCE though the Israelites would have been less likely to eat it due to association of Roman sacrifice. Until the 8th century, the upkeep for chickens meant they could only be raised in small numbers making them a delicacy few could afford outside of shabbat. Gentile "olla podrida" rose in popularity in the 13th century featuring a porridge with vegetables, spices and meat, usually cattle. 14th century famine in Northern Europe caused a rise in cattle prices near Western Europe and North Africa where most Jews were living under Moorish peace as Muslim Umayyad Empire was more tolerant of Abrahamic religions. This led to chicken replacing cattle as livestock and resulted in mass recipe changes to accommodate access of resources in Iberia and Northern Africa.

The increase in chicken led to a surplus of eggs as a renewable resource. "Huevos haminados" began to describe the long process of long roasting eggs in hamin pots overnight that produced a signature aroma. The concept of "re'ach nicho'ach" describes the direct line of spiritual connection of scents from the nose to the soul. giving the egg an extra spiritual strength for Jews. In Kabbalah, the eggs are even watched over by an angel.

Post Reconquista: Blech 
The rise of the Spanish conquest of Iberia, known as the Reconquista, stretched from as early as the establishment of Christian Kingdom Austurius in the early 8th century until the surrendering of Granada in 1492 by the ruling Moorish Kingdom. Jews were faced with limited options after the Alhambra Decree expelled non-Christian religious practices or face expulsion. Jews who migrated west across the Mediterranean after the destruction of the 2nd Temple became known as "Sephardic" Jews (literally Spanish Jews) and often reintegrated themselves to well established Jewish communities in North Africa or even the Ottoman Empire where a new language called "ladino", a mix of Hebrew and Spanish, began to explode in popularity.

Jews "conversos" (converts) converted, either sincerely or as a ruse, began to mainstream Jewish practices into Iberian culture. Sephardim who remained religious learned to hide observation of shabbat by "hiding" or "concealing" their pots in the embers of household fires or underground ovens from their Christian neighbors. Hamin became known as adafina or dafina as local ingredients changed hamin's base to a rice and chicken dish to match local practices.  Stews like "gallina al vinegreta" began to rise in popularity nationally around the same making the ingredients almost indistinguishable.

The slow warming of the embers inspired an extra layer of precaution to the prohibition of cooking on shabbat, the blech. The blech covers a fire or modern stovetops to prevent cooking while allowing heat to transfer from one item to another indirectly as a warm source without "kindling". Hamin, scheena and cholent all commonly use a blech pinpointing their distinctions to a similar time period. The unique cooking requirements of were later the inspiration for the invention of the slow cooker.

Columbian Exchange: Potatoes, tomatoes, harissa, beans 
Even in ancient Israel, it is likely that vegetables supplemented stews with native vegetables like leek, garlic and onions which were more accessible to poorer communities like future Ashkenazi. Historians have little proof other than modern economic trends as there was little documentation in the original period and vegetables decompose making it harder to note from archaeological evidence.

After the Columbian Exchange, new vegetables like potatoes, tomatoes and beans rose in popularity. They offered more substantial nutrients at lower costs than meats but with more flavor than barley, wheat or rice. In the Maghreb, a South American hot chili pepper called "harissa" thrived in the regions soil. Slow cooking crushed wheat, tomatoes and harissa created a spicy sauce that added new flavors to classic rice dishes.

Beans from the New World rapidly replaced barley and rice used in North Africa and Europe. In Greece and Turkey, "avicas" substituted the rice in hamin with white beans and even smaller haricot beans left over from Shabbat's Friday night dinner.

Ashkenazi Jews and brisket 

The relative accessibility of cattle in the region may have been due to cold winters requiring costlier food instead of reliance on grazing, resulting in higher frequency in the slaughter of cattle and preservation, as the beef could be stored in the winter. As a generally poorer population facing discrimination, Jews opted for the tougher, kosher cuts of cattle like brisket that would tenderize after long periods of roasting like in shabbat stews.  "Bal tashchit" ("don't destroy") was applied to not wasting and using everything available as an ingredient during hard times, which encouraged using scraps of brisket rather than full roasts. However, brisket was incorporated as a celebratory food as early as the 18th century.

Modern Israel 
In modern Israel, cholent has become a dish widely available in restaurants. In 2013, cholenterias, casual restaurants specializing in cholent, emerged in Bnei Brak and the Haredi neighborhoods of Jerusalem, and became the premier night hangout areas for Haredi men between their Torah study sessions. Soon afterwards, cholent dishes spread to restaurants in secular areas.

Sephardim in Tel Aviv originated "sofrito" made of beef, potatoes and various spices eaten at Friday night shabbat dinners and added to the main meal the next day.

Variations

Central and South Asian Jews 
Bukharian Jews who live in the Kyzyl-Kum Desert and near mountain ranges were mostly isolated but situated in a spot near accessible to the Silk Road granting access to Asian rices like basmati to replace barley. A local dish called "plov" used a cotton bag filled with rice, meats (usually goat or liver) and herbs that tinted the mixture green. The cotton bag kept the rice intact overnight until the daytime meal where "bakhshi plov", "bakhshi shabotiy" or "Bakhshi khaltagiy" would be served. In Azerjiban, plov is served as several separate layers on top of an egg base. In Bukharan Jewish cuisine, a hot Shabbat dish with meat (usually from the shin of kosher livestock), Asiatic rice that doubles in size, and fruits like raisins, "tapuach" or modern substitute of Granny Smith Apples added for a unique sweet and sour taste is called oshi sabo (also oshevo or osh savo). The name of the dish in Persian or Bukharian Jewish dialect means "hot food [oshi or osh] for Shabbat [sabo or savo]", reminiscent of both hamin and s'hina.

Ukrainian and Georgian Jews enjoyed a heavy vegetable diet. Adzhapsandali, which features eggplant and adzuki beans likely introduced by the Persians along the Silk Road, is characterized by the large copper pots used to cook it.

Among Iraqi Jews, the hot Shabbat stew is called t'bit and consists of whole chicken skin filled with a mixture of rice, chopped chicken meats, tomatoes and herbs. The stuffed chicken skin in t'bit calls to mind the Ashkenazi helzel, chicken neck skin stuffed with a flour and onion mixture that often replaces (or supplements) the kishke in European cholent recipes.

Indian Jews in Bombay traditionally ate a similar dish of chicken and rice together with spices such as ginger, turmeric, and cardamon.

North Africa 

In Tunisia, Jews adapted Muslim "Pkaila" or "bekaila" which used charred spinach, beef or lamb and legumes. In Morocco, the hot dish eaten by Jews on the Sabbath is traditionally called s'hina or skhina (Arabic for "the warm dish"; Hebrew spelling סכינא).  S'hina is made with potatoes, meat, whole eggs simmering in the pot and chickpeas replacing the occasional rice, barley hulled wheat.

Ethiopian Jews traditionally eat a kosher version of doro wat on Shabbat called "Sanbat wat", a stew of chicken and hard-boiled eggs commonly seasoned with berber, cloves, onions, and other savory ingredients. It is traditionally served with injera similarly to challah with cholent. "Alicha wot", Aramaic for "mild", features a vegetarian version without berbere.

In Egypt, "ferik" was used as a method of cooking harisa involving unripened, crushed wheat that gave the dish by the same name a unique green hue. Historians argue whether the ferik method was used before Sephardic migration after the 13th century since Jews did not live in Egypt in large numbers post-exodus until Spanish expulsion. Egyptian Jews did not regularly include meat in their mostly vegetarian diets though chicken was prevalent for Shabbat after the Sephardic diaspora.

North, Central and Eastern European 

In Italy, pasta is a common substitute for beans or rice in shabbat stews and is called "hamin macaron" when sampled in Iberia. The rise of Chassidism in the late 18th century popularized blackbeans in Eastern Europe as the Bal Shem Tov's favorite bean while Alastian Cholent in France featured lima beans.

North and South America 
To honor the tradition of eggs in cholent, some American Jews long roast meatloafs for Friday night and place whole eggs to be peeled and eaten. The Kosher Cajun Cookbook features New Orleans style cajun food with kosher substitutes like gumbo and jambalaya. Puerto Rican hamin is considered a stewed "arroz con pollo."

Shabbat stews and gentiles

Ancient and medieval literary sources 
Philosophers and historians, during the late Talmudic era such as Josephus, Philo, Strabo, Tacitus, and Luke provide inklings of Jewish history by the Roman period but do not mention cholent or similar variations of shabbat stews by name.

Cholent was first mentioned by name 1180 CE by R. Yitzhak ben Moshe of Vienna who says "I saw in France in the home of my teacher R. Yehuda bar Yitzhak that sometimes their cholent pots were buried. And on Shabbat before the meal, the servants light the fire near the cauldrons so that they warm well, and some remove them and bring them close to the fire".

Harisa is mentioned by Ibn Al Karim in Kitab Al-Tabikh as early as  the seventh century. In the anecdotal cookbook, the Umayyad Caliph, Mu'awiya, returns from a trip to Arabia after returning to his newly won Persian lands. In some versions of the story, Mu'awiya is met with some Yemenite Jews whom he asks to prepare the porrige he tasted abroad while in other versions, he approaches locals. This story should be taken with a grain of salt as the author penned the story three centuries after it supposedly occurred. At the very least, harisa was prevalent as a Levantine dish.

Communal cooking 
In the shtetls of Europe, religious neighborhoods in Jerusalem, and other cities in the Land of Israel before the advent of electricity and cooking gas, a pot with the assembled but uncooked ingredients was brought to the local baker before sunset on Fridays. The baker would put the pot with the cholent mixture in his oven, which was always kept fired, and families would come by to pick up their cooked cholent on Saturday mornings. The same practice was observed in Morocco, where black pots of s'hina (see Variations below) were placed overnight in bakers' ovens and then delivered by bakers' assistants to households on Shabbat morning. Jewish stews were characterized by flour paste used to seal pots to prevent cooking and tampering which could cause the meal to become treif.

Gentile variations 
The Jewish people of Hungary adapted the Hungarian dish sólet to serve the same purpose as cholent. Sólet was likely modified by the Jewish people living in Pannonia when the Magyars arrived. This pork version of solet became so popular that it is sold across the country as a canned good in grocery stores.

In Southern US, cattle is a popular livestock that pairs neatly with American style BBQ. Jewish slow roasting brisket methods were quickly adapted and by the 1960s, US president Lyndon B. Johnson served Texas brisket to foreign dignitaries as a representative of national cuisine.

See also

 Ashkenazi Jewish cuisine
 Cocido madrileño
 Macaroni Hamin
 Israeli cuisine
 Jewish cuisine
 Kashrut
 Kosher foods
 List of stews

References

Bibliography
 Ben Zeev, Miriam. Diaspora Judaism in Turmoil, 116/117 CE: Ancient Sources and Modern Insights. Dudley, MA: Peeters, 2005.
 Brumberg-Kraus, Jonathan. Gastronomic Judaism as Culinary Midrash. Lanham, Maryland: Lexington Books, an imprint of The Rowman & Littlefield Publishing Group, Inc., 2019.
 Cohen, Jake. Jew-Ish : Reinvented Recipes from a Modern Mensch : a Cookbook. Boston: Houghton Mifflin Harcourt, 2021.
 Cooper, Alanna. “Bukharan Jews.” In Oxford Bibliographies. New York, NY: Oxford University Press, 2017 rev. 2021, https://www.oxfordbibliographies.com/view/document/obo-9780199840731/obo-9780199840731-0146.xml#:~:text=Bukharan%20Jews%20(also%20known%20as,states%20of%20Uzbekistan%20and%20Tajikistan.
 Cooper, John. Eat and Be Satisfied : a Social History of Jewish Food. Northvale, N.J: Jason Aronson, 1993.
 Covert, Mildred L., and Sylvia P. Gerson. Kosher Cajun Cookbook. Gretna, La: Pelican Pub. Co., 1987.
 Diner, Hasia R., Simone Cinotto, and Carlo Petrini. Global Jewish Foodways : a History. Edited by Hasia R. Diner and Simone Cinotto. Lincoln, NE: University of Nebraska Press, 2018.
 Dubov, Nissan Dovid. The Laws of Cooking on Shabbos. Brooklyn, NY: Sichos In English, 2001.
 Elais and Gary. “Lamb Harissa & Gazelle’s Horns.” Santa Fe, NM: Made In Marrow, 2019, Made In Marrow's Meal 57: Lamb Harissa & Gazelle's Horns.
 Ganzfried, Solomon ben Joseph, Hyman E. Goldin, Joseph ben Ephraim Karo, and Hyman E. Goldin. Code of Jewish Law = Kitzur Shulḥan Aruḥ : a Compilation of Jewish Laws and Customs. Annotated rev. ed. Rockaway Beach, N.Y: Hebrew Pub. Co., 1993.
 Gavin, Paola. “Red Hot Chili Peppers.” In Tablet Magazine. New York, NY: Nextbook Inc., 2022.
 Golstein, Rabbi Zalman. Going Kosher in 30 Days! : An Easy Step-By-Step Guide for the Rest of Us. Monsey, NY: Jewish Learning Group, 2013.
 González-Salinero, Raúl. Military Service and the Integration of Jews into the Roman Empire.” Leiden and Boston, MA: The Brill Reference Library of Judaism, 2022.
 Gross, Aaron S., Jody Elizabeth Myers, Jordan Rosenblum, Hasia R. Diner, and Jonathan Safran Foer. Feasting and Fasting : the History and Ethics of Jewish Food. Edited by Aaron S. Gross, Jody Elizabeth Myers, and Jordan Rosenblum. New York: New York University Press, 2019.
 Gur, Janna. The Book of New Israeli Food : a Culinary Journey. 1st American ed. New York: Schocken Books, 2007.
 Haber, Joel. "Chulent and Hamin: The Ultimate Jewish Comfort Food: Celebrating the Most Jewish Food With 12 International Recipes." In The Taste of Jewish Culture. San Francisco, CA: Word Press, 2022, https://www.tasteofjew.com/wp-content/uploads/2022/09/Chulent-Hamin.pdf.
 Haber, Joel “Ferik-Egyptian Hamin.” In The Taste of Jewish Culture. Jerusalem, Israel: Aish.com, 2022, https://aish.com/ferik-egyptian-hamin/.
 Hackett, Conrad and Grim, Brian J. et all. “The Global Religious Landscape: A Report on the Size Distribution of the World’s Major Religious Groups as of 2010.” In The Pew Forum on Religion and Public Life. Washington D.C.: The Pew Research Center's Forum on Religion and Public Life, 2012.
 Heschel, Abraham Joshua. The Sabbath : Its Meaning for Modern Man. New York, NY: Farrar, Straus and Giroux, 2005.
 Ibn al-Karīm, Muḥammad ibn al-Ḥasan, and Charles Perry. A Baghdad Cookery Book: the Book of Dishes (Kitāb Al-Ṭabīkh). Totnes: Prospect, 2005.
 Johnson, George. “Scholars Debate Roots of Yiddish, Migration of Jews.” In The New York Times. New York, NY: The New York Times, October 29, 1996, https://www.nytimes.com/1996/10/29/science/scholars-debate-roots-of-yiddish-migration-of-jews.html .
 Judah, Yehudah ibn Tibon and Abraham Zifroni. Sefer ha-Kuzari. Tel Aviv, Israel: Schoken Publishing House, 1970.
 Kimiagarov, Amnun. Classic Central Asian (Bukharian) Jewish Cuisine and Customs. New York, NY: Alpha Translation & Publishing, 2010.
 Karo, Joseph ben Ephraim, Moses ben Israel Isserles, and Yitsḥak ben Aharon. Shulḥan ʻarukh  ... Krakow: Sons of Isaac Prustits, 1618.
 Language and Culture Archive of Ashkenazic Jewry Digital Archive, Columbia University Libraries. New York, NY: Columbia University, 2022, Research Guides: Language and Culture Archive of Ashkenazic Jewry Digital Archive User Guide: Introduction.
 Lebewohl, Sharon., and Rena. Bulkin. The 2nd Ave Deli Cookbook : Recipes and Memories from Abe Lebewohl’s Legendary New York Kitchen. New York: Villard, 1999.
 Maimonides. The 613 Mitzvot or Sefer Hamitzvos. Translated by Berel Bell. Brooklyn, NY: Sichos in English, 2006.
 Marks, Gil.  Encyclopedia of Jewish Foods. Hoboken, N.J.: John Wiley & Sons, 2010.
 Nathan, Joan. Jewish Cooking in America. Expanded edition. New York: Alfred A. Knopf Inc., 1998.
 Newhouse, Alana, Stephanie Butnick, Noah Fecks, Joana Avillez, and Gabriella Gershenson. The 100 Most Jewish Foods : a Highly Debatable List. Edited by Alana Newhouse, Stephanie Butnick, and Gabriella Gershenson. New York: Artisan, 2019.
 Ottolenghi, Yotam., and Sami. Tamimi. Jerusalem : a Cookbook. 1st U.S. ed. Berkeley: Ten Speed Press, 2012.
 Pintel-Ginsberg, Idit. The Angel and the Cholent : Food Representation from the Israel Folktale Archives. Detroit, MI: Wayne State University Press, 2021.
 Pressman, Hannah. “What is the History of Ladino and its Alphabet”. In Stroum Center for Jewish Studies Newsletter. Seattle, WA: Henry M. Jackson School of International Studies at the University of Washington, 2020, What is the history of Ladino and its alphabet?. 
 Richardson, Peter and Amy Marie Fisher. Herod : King of the Jews and Friend of the Romans. Second edition. Abingdon, Oxon: Routledge, 2018.
 Shor, Leanne. “This Bukharian Jewish Meaty Rice Dish is the Crockpot Meal You Need.” In JMore Baltimore Living. Baltimore, MD: Maryland Jewish Media, 2018, This Bukharian Jewish Meaty Rice Dish is the Crockpot Meal You Need.
 Stavans, Ilan. Jewish Literature : a Very Short Introduction. New York, NY: Oxford University Press, 2021.
 Stein, Lori and Ronald H. Isaacs. Let’s Eat : Jewish Food and Faith. Lanham, Maryland: Rowman & Littlefield, 2018.
 Tauber, Yanki. Beyond the Letter of Law: A Chassidic Companion to the Talmud’s Ethics of the Fathers. 1st edition. Brooklyn NY: Vaad Hanochos Hatmimim, 1994.
 Yitzahk ben Moishe or “Zaruah” in his Mishnah Torah. Or Zaruah, part 2, Hilhot Erev Shabbat, 3b

Israeli cuisine
Jewish cuisine
Shabbat food
Stews
Yiddish words and phrases